Rohat Alakom (born 1955) is a Kurdish author from Kars, Turkey who writes his books in Kurdish, Turkish and Swedish. He was born in a village of Kağızman a district of Kars Province. He went to high school in Kağızman, Later, he went to the capital of Turkey Ankara for higher education. After living in Bulgaria (1979–1980) and Germany (1980–1982) he went to Sweden. He is currently living in Sweden.

External links
 Kürdoloji Biliminin 200 Yıllık Geçmişi (Komkar, 1987)
 Çağdaş Türk Edebiyatında Kürtler (Vejîn-1989, Fırat-1991, Avesta-2010)
 Di Çavkaniyên Swêdî de Motîvên Kurdî (Vejîn-1991)
 Unutulmuşluğun Bir Öyküsü: Said-î Kürdi (Fırat-1991)
 Ziya Gökalp’in Büyük Çilesi: Kürtler (Fırat-1992)
 Yaşar Kemal’in Yapıtlarında Kürt Gerçeği (Fırat-1992)
 Di Folklora Kurdî de Serdestiyeke Jinan (Nûdem-1994)
 Li Kurdistanê Hêzeke Nû: Jinên Kurd (Apec-1995)
 Bir Kürt Diplomatının Fırtınalı Yılları: Şerif Paşa (Apec-1995, Avesta-1998)
 Eski İstanbul Kürtleri (Avesta-1998)
 Hoybun Örgütü ve Ağrı Ayaklanması (Avesta-1998, Avesta-2011)
 Svensk-kurdiska kontakter under tusen år (Apec-2000)
 Folklor û jinên kurd (NEFEL, 2002)
 Arîstokratên Kurd: Torin (Apec-2003. Torin: Arîstokratên Serhedê, Avesta-2009)
 Orta Anadolu Kürtleri (Apec-2003, Evrensel 2004, Evrensel-2007)
 Kurdên Swêdê (Serkland-2006)
 Kurderna- Fyrtio år i Sverige (Serkland-2007)
 Ronahîya Dîrokê (Aran-2008)
 Dünyanın En Yaşlı Adamı-Zaro Ağa (Avesta-2009)
 Kars Kürtleri (Avesta-2009)
 Kağızman-Kars’ın Tadı Tuzu (Kağızman Belediyesi-2012)
 Komkujiya Ermenîyan -1915 (Avesta, 2015) 
 Xatirê Te Stockholm! Selahaddîn Rastgeldî (Apec, 2016)
 Dîroka Kurdistanê di çapemeniya swêdî de (Apec, 2016)
 Jinên kurd di çavkaniyên swêdî de (Apec, 2016)

References

People from Kağızman
Kurdish humanities academics
Swedish people of Kurdish descent
Living people
1955 births